Besharat District is a district (bakhsh) in Aligudarz County, Lorestan Province, Iran. At the 2006 census, its population was 9,907, in 1,673 families.  The District is entirely rural.

References 

Districts of Lorestan Province
Aligudarz County